James Joseph Ashworth (1918–1990) was an Irish footballer. His only known club was Blackpool, for whom he made four Football League appearances in 1938.

References

1918 births
1990 deaths
Irish Free State association footballers
Blackpool F.C. players
Association football forwards